Iolanda Cristina Gigliotti (17 January 1933 – 3 May 1987), professionally known as Dalida, was an Italian-French singer and actress, born in Egypt. With around 140 million records sold worldwide, she is one of the best-selling italian music artist. Her best known songs are "Bambino", "Gondolier", "Les enfants du Pirée", "Le temps des fleurs", "Darla dirladada", "J'attendrai", "Le jour où la pluie viendra", "Gigi l'amoroso", "Salama ya salama", and "Paroles, paroles" featuring spoken word by Alain Delon.

First an actress, she made her debut in the film A Glass and a Cigarette by Niazi Mustapha in 1955. One year later, having signed with the Barclay record company, Dalida achieved her first success as a singer with "Bambino". Following this, she became the most important seller of records in France between 1957 and 1961. Her music charted in many countries in Europe, Latin America, North America, and Asia. She collaborated with singers such as Julio Iglesias, Charles Aznavour, Johnny Mathis and Petula Clark.

Although she shot a few films alongside her career as a singer, she effectively reconnected with cinema with The Sixth Day, a film by Youssef Chahine released in 1986. The film was successful in Egypt where three million people gathered in Shubra to see Dalida at the preview. In France, although the film was hailed by critics, it became a commercial failure.

Dalida was deeply disturbed by the suicide of her partner Luigi Tenco in 1967. Despite this, she moved ahead with her career, forming the record label International Show with her brother Orlando, recording more music and performing at concerts and music competitions, but continued to suffer bouts of depression. Dalida committed suicide on 3 May 1987.

Early years

Childhood in Cairo 

Dalida was born Iolanda Cristina Gigliotti in Cairo, Kingdom of Egypt, on 17 January 1933. Her father Pietro Gigliotti (1904–1945) and mother Filomena Giuseppina (née d’Alba; 1904–1971) were born in Serrastretta, Calabria in Italy. Pietro studied music in school and played violin in taverns; Giuseppina was a seamstress. By birth, Dalida automatically gained Italian nationality through jus sanguinis of both Italian parents.

Unable to make a living in their hometown, the young couple moved to the Shubra district of Cairo the year they were married, where, between the births of Iolanda's older brother Orlando (1930–1992) and younger brother Bruno (1936), the Gigliotti family became well established in the community. In addition to earnings from Giuseppina's work, their social status benefited when Pietro became primo violino at Cairo's Khedivial Opera House, and the family bought a two-storey house.

At 10 months old, Iolanda caught an eye infection and had to wear bandages for 40 days. Her father would play lullabies on the violin to soothe her. She underwent eye operations between the ages of three and five. Having to wear glasses throughout elementary school, for which she was bullied, she later recalled: "I was  enough of it, I would rather see the world in a blur than wear glasses, so I threw them through the window."  Iolanda attended the Scuola Tecnica Commerciale Maria Ausiliatrice, an Italian Catholic school located in northern Shubra.

In 1940, Allied forces took her father and other Italian men from their quarter to the Fayed prison camp in the desert near Cairo. When Pietro was released in 1944, he returned home as a completely different person, so violent that Iolanda and other children in the neighbourhood were scared of him. She later recalled, "I hated him when he beat me, I hated him especially when he beat my mom and brothers. I wanted him to die, and he did." Iolanda was twelve when Pietro died of a brain abscess in 1945. That trauma influenced her search for a male partner the rest of her life.

Modelling, acting 

In her teen years, Iolanda developed an interest in acting due to her uncle's job as a projectionist for a local cinema, and often participated in school performances at the end of the semester. She graduated in 1951, and began working as a copy typist in a pharmaceutical company the same year. While required to work to financially help her family, Iolanda still had acting ambitions.

Shortly thereafter, her best friend Miranda encouraged her to compete in Miss Ondine, a minor Cairo beauty pageant which she entered on the assurance that it was just for fun and that her mother would not find out. When Iolanda unexpectedly won second prize and Miranda won second runner-up, they were photographed and published in newspapers Le journal d'Égypte and Le progrès égyptien. The next day when her mother found out, she forcibly cut Iolanda's hair short. Eventually, her mother relented and Iolanda left her job to start modelling for Donna, a Cairo-based fashion house.

Three Egyptian film directors placed Iolanda in their productions; Marco de Gastyne cast her in The Mask of Tutankhamun (1954) and Niazi Mostafa cast her for a supporting role in A Glass and a Cigarette (1954), on which posters she appears with her newly adopted stage name Dalila because, as she explained in 1968, "it was a very frequent name in Egypt and I liked it a lot."

Relocation to Paris and decisive 421 dice game 

On 25 December 1954, Dalila left Egypt for Paris. Her first residence was a room in an apartment of Gastyne's friend, the impresario Vidal. She met with a number of directors, auditioned for movie roles, but failed each time. Vidal relocated her to a smaller apartment where her first neighbour was Alain Delon (then still unknown to the wider public), with whom she had a brief relationship.

Dalila's difficulty in finding acting work throughout 1955, led her to try singing. Vidal introduced her to Roland Berger, a friend and professor who agreed to give her singing lessons seven days per week at a low price. He was strict and used to yell, with Dalila responding even more loudly. Their lessons sometimes ended with her slamming the door, but she always returned the next day. Seeing her progress, Berger arranged for her to perform in the cabaret Le Drap d'Or on Champs-Élysées, where she was spotted by Jacques Paoli, the director of another cabaret, La Villa d'Este. Paoli engaged her for a series of performances that proved popular, and Dalila received her first attention of the public in France among which was Bruno Coquatrix, the director of Olympia, who invited her to perform at his singing contest Les Numéros 1 de demain. In future years, Coquatrix said: "[H]er voice is full of colour and volume, and has all that men love: gentleness, sensuality and eroticism." Dalila was also spotted by author and screenwriter Alfred Marchand, who advised to change her name to Dalida: "Your pseudonym resembles too much the movie Samson and Delilah and it won't help to boost your popularity. Why don't you replace the second 'l' with a 'd', like God the father?" She immediately accepted the change.

On 9 April 1956, Dalida participated in the singing contest Les Numéros 1 de demain, performing Etrangère au Paradis. Prior to the competition, Eddie Barclay, owner of the largest recording house in France, Barclay, and Lucien Morisse, artistic director of the newly established radio station Europe n°1, met in Bar Romain (now Petit Olympia) and discussed what to do that evening. Barclay wanted to watch a film, whereas Morisse wanted to attend the singing competition, which was being held at Olympia Hall, then the largest venue in Paris. They settled their disagreement by playing 421, a dice game, which Morisse won. Together with their friend Coquatrix, they were greatly impressed after Dalida won the contest, and arranged a meeting with her. That event was later perpetuated in biopics and books, and became regarded as fateful for Dalida's career. The three men went on to play a large part in launching her career.

Career

Les années Barclay – The Barclay years

First contract and overnight success with Bambino 

After the performance in Les Numéros 1 de demain, Lucien handed Dalida his card to meet in his office as soon as possible, which she accepted without hesitation. A few days later, on the second floor of the building at 26 rue François ler, she performed "Barco Negro", a recent hit by Amália Rodrigues, humming the a cappella verses and tapping the fingertips on a corner of Morisse's desk. Visibly satisfied, his interlocutor demanded more work on mini-flaws, for a new audition in front of Eddie Barclay in person. On 2 May 1956 in Barclay's office at 20, Rue de Madrid, Dalida signed a renewable one-year contract, with a modest percentage on record sales, with the promise of increasing it if the expected success was accomplished. While Morisse was responsible for radio promotion, Coquatrix had developed a strategy to grab the headlines. He planned to promote her through a series of concerts, including two concerts at the Olympia, two weeks in Bobino, and a tour of the provinces.

Her first song "Madona" was recorded in June and was first released in August on EP with three other songs. "Madona" was played on 28 August 1956 on Radio Europe n°1, which was Dalida's first radio appearance. The record achieved sufficient success and was followed by second EP, Le Torrent, a month later, which received an equally encouraging welcome. Dalida continued performing live throughout the latter part of 1956, while her promoters worked on developing a song that would make her a star; Morisse asked lyricist Jacques Larue to write a French language version of "Guaglione", the winning song of recent fifth Festival di Napoli, which would become Bambino.

"Bambino" was released in early December only as a promo single, but quickly receiving more public interest than all of her previous recordings, Morisse started to heavily promote it and it was placed as title song to Dalida's debut album Son nom est Dalida that was issued by the end of same month. The album was immediately followed with a third EP titled "Bambino". After debuting at number seven in January 1957, Bambino reached number one and went on to become the biggest-selling and one of the most beloved pop standard hits of the 1950s in France, Belgium, Canada and Switzerland. As the song knocked Doris Day's "Whatever Will Be, Will Be" off the top of the French charts, women began to emulate Dalida's makeup, resulting in the explosion of Rimmel sales, while the men saw in her a talent, sensuality and sexiness. Coquatrix then named her "the first sex-symbol of the song". "Bambino" was Dalida's first number-one hit, and through 1957 it became the longest-running number-one in the world history, with a total of 39 consecutive weeks, still holding a record. It made Dalida an overnight star and gained her first gold disc, the very first time such an award had been received by a woman, on 19 September 1957 for sales of over 300,000. As the French music industry was then still in the background, "Bambino" was described in 2007 by Bertrand Dicale of Le Figaro as; "a launch that announced what will happen in the coming decades ... a start of really modern times where singer is more important than song". Promoting it in early 1957, Dalida also made her first TV appearance, and her contract was immediately extended for four years. Then she also received her first criticism from a journalist: "On stage, Dalida appears in beauty and warmth, highlighted by a presentation of extreme sobriety."

First Olympia concert, new success with Gondolier, tourings and return to film 

On the night of 27 February 1957, Dalida held her first concert at the Olympia, as the opening act for Charles Aznavour, and was widely applauded. Then, in April, she performed in a successful two-week series of concerts at Bobino, and in the summer a fan club was established, the first such club to be devoted to a female artist. Among live performances, the prolonged success of Bambino through 1957 was followed with new recordings like Miguel, and Tu n'as pas très bon caractère that eventually replaced Bambino as number one in France in October. Dalida came back to Olympia in September as opening act for Gilbert Bécaud, when the newly renovated Olympia appeared for first time with the red neon facade sign. The future iconic symbol of the hall, Bécaud and Dalida became the first two names to appear in it. After her second success there, Dalida released her second album Miguel and returned to studio in mid-October to record, what was to become one of her old standards, Histoire d'un amour. Staying in top ten for eight months, it earned Dalida her a second gold disc.

Dalida's experimenting with exotica resulted with "Gondolier", released over Christmas in 1957. For the exotica song with accentuated vocals, Dalida delivered a TV appearance where, while sailing the imaginary gondola, her dress' shoulder strap fell down. The reappearances of the video in the 1970s made the moment notable, and public started considering it iconic as Dalida dared to do such thing on television during conventional times of society. Nevertheless, "Gondolier" debuted at number one on both French and Canadian charts where it spent four months, remained in top twenty for almost a year and became her biggest hit since "Bambino". Its B side Pardon also proved popular, reaching number one in Canada. Then Dalida also started to perform more frequently in France, Belgium and Luxembourg.

By the end of April 1958, a radio programmer heard Dalida recording "Dans le bleu du ciel bleu" in Barclay's Hoche studios in Paris. Immediately asking for a copy of the tape and passing it on the antenna, the radio station was flocked with phone calls of people asking for the number of the disc and when would it be available. As the song replaced "Gondolier" as number one in France, Dalida scored a still-running chart record of France of five songs simultaneously in the top ten. It was followed by her receipt of RMC's singer of the year award, which she went on to win for six consecutive years. In June she embarked upon her first "TDF avec Dalida 58" tour (Tour de France with Dalida); a daily appearance in the stage city of the 1958 Tour de France, which she repeated several time in future decades. Then she also performed in Algiers during summer, supporting the morale of French soldiers fighting the Algerian War, and held a new series of galas in France and Belgium that ended regularly with two hours of autograph signing. During that summer Dalida released her third album Gondolier, and also recorded several new songs like "Je pars", "Aïe mon cœur" and "Les Gitans"; all sales successes each earning Dalida a gold disc. With Je pars, Dalida started French rock 'n' roll and also paved the way for foreign rock artists to enter the market, like Paul Anka.

In late 1958, Dalida returned to film for her first on-screen role in four years, playing supporting role of singer-spy in the mystery film Rapt au deuxième bureau. A few months later, she appeared alongside Eddie Barclay in Brigade des mœurs, both starring as themselves. These two B movies were also used for promotion of her three songs "Inconnue mon amour", "L'amour chante", and "Aime-moi", and were released in September 1958 and March 1959, respectively.

On 9 October, she again performed at Bobino, this time for three weeks as the headline performer, where she promoted her latest releases "Du moment qu'on s'aime", that peaked the charts same week, and "Come prima". Topping charts in January 1959, where it remained during most of winter, "Come prima" proved to be an ultimate holiday hit of France and Belgium, as Dalida could be seen promoting it on a Christmas-themed television set. Record's B side song "Si je pouvais revivre un jour ma vie" also achieved success topping Canadian charts. According to her biographer Catherine Rihoit, her live television appearances "got her into the palms of society, keeping her position as a favorite singer of all age groups in the francophonie", and marked an era of late '50s television shows. On 26 December 1958 Dalida was in New York with Morisse where they met Norman Granz, the American impresario of Ella Fitzgerald, who invited her to Hollywood and offered a fifteen-year contract to launch her career in the USA. She quickly rejected the offer, saying that she wanted to focus on her musical career in France where she was already well-known with a secure fan base.

"Am Tag als der Regen kam" and international recognition; best selling singer in Europe 

Dalida toured extensively in 1959, playing sold-out dates in France, Egypt, Italy, and Germany. As her fame spread outside France, she started to record songs in other languages to cater for these new audiences. She understood five languages ​​and interpreted her songs in eleven languages: German, Egyptian Arabic, English, Lebanese Arabic, Spanish, French, Greek, Hebrew, Italian, Japanese and Dutch. In February, during a TV appearance, she performed her recent version of "Hava Nagila". On 2 March, Minister of informations awarded her, alongside Yves Montand, with the Bravos du music hall, the most prestigious music award in France, for the most popular singer in France. During the summer, she covered her own recordings "Ne joue pas" and "C'est ça l'amore" in Flemish as "Speel niet met m'n hart" and "Ik zing amore", respectively, the only time in her career she sang in Flemish.

In late summer, Dalida was back in the studio to record her first major international hit. In the period from 1958 to 1959, "Le jour ou la pluie viendra" was recorded in three languages, which led Dalida straight to the top three in six different European countries. The German language version "Am Tag als der Regen kam" topped German charts for ten weeks in September and October, earning her another gold disc. It was the best-selling record of the year in Germany, and remained one of the most successful songs in history of the country. During the closing night of the Berlin Film Festival on 28 September 1959, she was presented with a Goldener Löwe award by RTL, for the best-selling musical artist of the year in Germany, and saluted with fanfare playing "Am Tag als der Regen kam" verses. The song was her first international recognition, reaching a half-million accumulated copies and eventually remaining one of her biggest success in Germany.

In the course of 1959, Dalida collected five Top 10 hits in French charts, most notably "Ciao, ciao Bambina" and "Guitare et tambourin"; both earning gold discs. In Italy, RAI awarded her with Oscar di popolarità and Lupo d'oro awards for the best-selling musical artist of the year in the country. Those were her first two foreign awards that furthered her international recognition. Dalida also performed in successful sold out concerts in Berlin, Athens and Cairo, delivering a sentimental performance in front of a crowd in Rivoli cinema that she frequented as a child. On 23 September 1959, Dalida sang in a successful three-week run at Parisian Théâtre de l'Étoile, where a jukebox was installed in recognition of her being named Mademoiselle Jukebox, the most listened to artist on jukeboxes in France. By the end of the year, she released her fifth and sixth albums; Le disque d'or de Dalida and Love in Portofino, and had already sold three and a half million records, highest among all European artists.

"Les enfants du Pirée" and "Itsi Bitsi petit bikini"; transition to yé-yé and first Olympia concert residency 

Dalida debuted 1960 with "T'aimer follement", a chart topper in France and Belgium in February. Then she embarked upon her first world tour and reached top of the charts again, with "Romantica" in April. The third release of the year "Les enfants du Pirée" brought Dalida huge commercial success becoming her second big international hit after "Am Tag als der Regen kam". It reached top two in six European countries and Canada, topping charts in three of them. After its debut atop of French charts in June 1960, where it remained for 20 weeks, it became the first song by a French singer to sell over one million copies internationally, and the tube de l'été expression was invented after it. Dalida eventually recorded it in five different languages and made a video for TV emission Toute la chanson. With a harbor theme, showing Dalida singing and lying on a fishing net and artificial wind blowing, it made journalist Jacques Chancel call it; "the first video in France that really made a shift from the era of outdated videos".

The success was followed with her second win of Italian awards Oscar di Popolarità and a Lupo d'Oro for the best-selling musical artist of the year. Back in France, Dalida was not pleased with emergence of the new musical style yé-yé as the new singers would only occupy the charts and then irretrievably disappear. Also, since the appearance of new radio programs for youth like Salut les copains, both the music hall songs and singers, like Dalida, started to be regarded completely obsolete. As Dalida realized that she had to make a drastic change to retain her image, in September she covered the US hit "Itsi bitsi petit bikini". Today one of her signature songs, it became the first big yé-yé hit in France and received the title of second tube de l'été, displacing "Les enfants du Pirée" from top of charts. Securing her position of a lead singer in France, "Itsi bitsi petit bikini" introduced Dalida to a whole new generation of young fans. Topping charts across Western Europe and in Canada, the record was also her second one to sell over a million and gained her thirteenth golden disc.

Success was followed with "Milord", a number one in Austria, Germany and Italy, after which was named her first album issued solely for Italian public. Dalida then completed a year-long world tour, performing in countries across Europe, in Canada and several Arab states. In December, she issued EP "Joyeux Noël" collecting four best known holiday carols in French, and with New Year's show Réveillon de Paris breaking the record of TV audience with nearly six million spectators.

In January 1961, Dalida covered The Drifters' "Save the last dance for me" as "Garde Moi la Derniere Danse" that reached top two. It remained her biggest French hit of the year as she busied herself with another year-long world tour which started in Teheran on 18 February, in front of Iranian royal family in their Sa'dabad Palace. With a total of almost 200 dates, the tour's last leg included Dalida's first own concert residency at Olympia, premiering on 6 December. Due to her recent love affair, divorce from Morisse and new yé-yé wave, several critics announced it as "attestment of an end and downfall of Dalida". Indisputably, Dalida "brought the house down" according to Beuve-Méry of Le Monde, as the month long show was a sell-out success with the premiere night broadcast live by Radio Europe N°1. Among other musicians who attended, she was congratulated by Édith Piaf, who told her: "You are a winner, like me. After me, it will be you." Dalida also set the record for the biggest public attendance and the longest-running concert residency at the Olympia, with a total of 52,000 spectators in course of 30 days, that would be broken by herself in 1981. At the very end of the year, on 30 December Dalida completed her world tour in Olympia's Belgian equivalent Ancienne Belgique in Bruxelles.

During 1961, Dalida issued a set of new Italian songs on Canta in Italiano EP, and also scored several top ten hits internationally such as "Nuits d'espagne" and "Tu ne sais pas". In April she made "Pépé" a number one hit both in Austria and Germany, and "24 mille baisers" separately in Austria and France. She also issued two albums Dalida internationale and Loin de moi. During spring in Italy, Dalida signed with film director Giorgio Simonelli and revived her film career with the first film in which she plays the main role. Originally filmed as Italian movie Che femmina... e che dollari!, it was revoiced and retitled for French audience as "Parlez moi d'amour", after one of tracking songs. The movie also features several other recordings by Dalida, including posthumously released "Ho trovato la felicità". Contrary to her other previous movies, Che femmina... e che dollari! was not a commercial failure as the moderate gross eventually surpassed the low budget. Rihoit described: "sealing her appearance of the early 60's, since it is also her first color film, all the power and acting potential that Dalida carries in herself and transmits to the screen is clearly visible".

"La Leçon de Twist", "Le petit Gonzales", exhaust tours and scopitones 

After a short break Dalida was back on tour, this time starting in Canada where Tu peux le prendre had reached number one. On 5 February, in a popular youth French TV program Toute la Chanson, Dalida performed her latest yé-yé release "La Leçon de Twist". Accompanied on the piano by then leading French teen idol Johnny Hallyday, he also taught Dalida the moves for what she said: "he really showed himself, the most friendly of teachers of this new rhythm". The performance caused a sensation, boosting her track straight to top of French and Belgian charts. "La Leçon de Twist" was followed with another success of the same genre "Achète-moi un Juke-box". With lyrics; "Oh dad, buy me a jukebox, to listen to Elvis Presley, Les Chaussettes Noires, and Johnny Halliday. -And Dalida? But what is she doing here, they still listen to her?", Dalida joked on her own account referring to the current situation in France where the youth was fond of young singers, despite her success during yé-yé. Anyway, the record spent two weeks at number one during spring.

From April to July Dalida toured across Italy and Vietnam. In Saigon, her popularity led to traffic congestion when she performed, but the local authorities interrupted her show during a rendition of "La Leçon de Twist" because the song was considered to be a political act. In May Dalida was back on top of international charts with "Le petit Gonzales", a cover of "Speedy Gonzales", which peaked in France, Belgium, Canda and Spain the following month and remained known as "one of the most memorable and nostalgic recordings of yé-yé era", as said by Le Parisien in 1987. The album of the same name was issued by the end of the year.

Although Dalida filmed her first scopitone in 1961 for the song "Loin de moi", starting a string of music videos followed by almost all yé-yé newcomers, her best critically and commercially received scopitone was recorded in September 1962 for song "Le jour le plus long", in which she paid tribute to Allies' disembarkation in Normandy on 6 June 1944. Under the direction of young Claude Lelouch, who later became one of the most acclaimed French directors, Dalida was dressed as a soldier, walked through a war-torn forest in the middle of the bombs and had accompanied real scenes from the Second World War. An unusual image of Dalida found its public and was a hit in cafes. Alongside Dalida's performance of the song on 26 September, in front of a crowd of 2,000 people on the first floor of the Eiffel Tower, "Le jour le plus long" topped charts in France for two weeks and earned her another gold disc.

More concentration on concerts, shift to pop; "Eux", "Amore scusami" and first platinum disc 

Dalida fully spent 1963 delivering live appearance across the whole world and dedicating herself more to Canadian youth public, as in France the yé-yé experienced its greatest swing in this period. Her world tour was a success, with sold out concerts in Europe from Portugal to Poland, Canada, Asia, Fort-de-France, Latin America and the Arabian countries. In Algeria, she became the first artist to appear since the proclamation of independence. Dalida also dedicated the late summer period again to filming, so she went to Hong Kong for three months to star in B movie L'Inconnue de Hong-Kong, alongside Serge Gainsbourg. Although the movie was a commercial flop, Dalida received favorable reviews.

In January 1963 at Cortina d'Ampezzo, Dalida was awarded with the Oscar Mondiale del Successo dei Juke Box award for the most listened artist on the jukeboxes in Europe. Later the same month, she made a shift from yé-yé covering Ben E. King's "Stand by Me" as "Tu croiras", which was followed by an equally more melancholic string of recordings such as "Le jour du retour", a summer number one hit in Canada, and "Eux" that later peaked at number two in Argentina and was recorded in five languages. "Eux" was awarded with the Oscar mundial du success du disque for drawing the most international sales by a French artist in 1963, and Dalida named her fourteenth studio album after it.

The 1963 world tour was prolonged into 1964 only with several short breaks. The tour's French leg started on 11 April 1964, after which Dalida traveled 30,000 kilometers solely by car during its five-month run, with a public attendance over 200,000. "The most iconic moment of tour" as said by her brother Orlando, was a concert at Draguignan on 14 August when "Dalida appeared with blond hair for the first time, and shocked the crowd that that didn't recognized her at first glance". After the concert in Pont-sur-Yonne on 2 September, Dalida accepted the local truck drivers' offer to become their godmother of honor. The tour was emulated with concert residency in Olympia two days later when Dalida and other celebrities; Charles Aznavour, Françoise Hardy, Johnny Hallyday and Sylvie Vartan, were brought to the Olympia's entrance by the same drivers on their roofless trucks, making a parade alongside the streets of Paris. The event threw even more attention to the sold-out three-week residency that already received a huge media coverage. During the television transmission of the crowd at the entrance, a teenage fan said: "We can hardly wait for her [Dalida] to appear, we've been screaming for an hour and the atmosphere is so crazy", on which the reporter turned to the camera: "the whole Paris came to see [parade], only in front of Olympia there are at least 2,000 people waiting in the street".

As Dalida again recorded simultaneously to her concerts in course of 1964, releases like "Ce coin de terre", "Ne t'en fais pas pour ça" and "Chaque instant de" were poorly promoted through TV, eventually entering only top twenty. "Là il a dit" peaked at number six in Canada earlier in the year, but finishing the tour in November, Dalida came back to the studio to record "Amore scusami", the orchestral pop sentimental ballad which was a completely new genre to her repertoire. The song was rushed into release and swiftly became hit at the end of the year, earning Dalida another gold disc, the first in two years since "Le jour le plus long". Following the success of "Amore scusami", an album of the same name was released and on 17 September. Dalida was awarded with a platinum disc for surpassing sales of over 10 million records since her debut in 1956. Specifically created for her, it was a first time in music industry that a term "platinum disc" was used.

Refusing to perform at Sanremo Music Festival, Dalida instead released EP Sanremo 65 that included her latest Italian top ten hit "Ascoltami". Delivering new performances at Bobino and Tête de l'Art in following months, she was in top ten in France and Belgium with a cover of Rita Pavone's "Viva la pappa" that gained Dalida huge interest among children's public. The B side "La sainte totoche", written and composed by Charles Aznavour, peaked at number six in Turkey and was applauded by prestige critic Lettres françaises that wrote "Sainte Totoche enters the calendar" as it "evokes the women neglected by their husbands". Back on world tour in 1965, Dalida held concerts in Fort-de-France where she was welcomed by more than 20,000 enthusiastic Martinicans who caused a stagnation in the city. France-Antilles reported "Only the President of the Republic had ovation of this scale, during his visit in March 1964". The next day, Dalida herself rewarded Juliana Brown, the winner of Dalida Song Contest which was established in her honour. A poll conducted by IFOP on 24 April 1965, voted Dalida as the favourite French singer of the decade, ahead Édith Piaf.

"La Danse de Zorba" and "Il silenzio" 

In June 1965, Dalida recorded "La Danse de Zorba", a song from 1964 comedy movie Zorba the Greek, which became her biggest international success since "24 mille baisers" in early 1961. The song once again brought Dalida to seven international charts, entering the top three in six and topping in two countries. Surpassing a million copies, it also earned Dalida two more golden discs; in France, and in Brazil where it was also awarded with the Cico Viola award for the best selling record of the year. With daily appearances on television dancing to song on a Sirtaki, Dalida marked the summer period of 1965 and "La Danse de Zorba" received title of that year's tube de l'été, alongside Christophe's Aline and Hervé Villard's Capri c'est fini.

During summer, Dalida performed in Morocco and Algeria, played a supporting role in Italian comedy movie Menage all'italiana, alongside Ugo Tognazzi and then debutante Romina Power, and released one of her first records in single format Wenn die Soldaten.

In October, the song "Il silenzio" came out on the fourth EP of the year. It was also a chart-topping hit in Europe, Canada and Latin America, reaching number one in France and Italy, where it was the best selling record of the year beating "La Danse de Zorba" and receiving a gold disc. Alongside were issued "Le flamenco" and "Scandale dans la famille" that were also well-received in Belgium and Canada. The success of "Il silenzo" concluded the most successful year in Dalida's career up to that date and produced the album of the same name, which collated that year's releases.

1966 was marked by an extensive year-long world tour that started on 13 February in Paris, and ended on 31 December in Toulouse. With more than 150 dates, Dalida toured Canada, Latin America, Arab states and across Europe. The year debuted with a number-one hit in Latin America, "El Cordobés", which was a product of friend collaboration with bullfighter Manuel Benitez, to whom Dalida dedicated the song as they had a brief affair. In the same period, Dalida also started employing family members, with her cousin Rosy as her secretary, and brother Bruno as her artistic director. Until the end of year, they produced the successful Italian album Pensiamoci ogni sera and three more EPs. "Parlez moi de lui" did not achieve commercial success but became one of her first power ballads, based on experiences in her own life, and made commercial in US by Cher as "The Way of Love". On the contrary, Bang Bang was the number one hit in Argentina and Italy where it was also the best selling record of the year. "Petit homme" charted internationally and was accompanied with Dalida delivering energetic live performances with tambourine. Dalida also returned to wide screen, with a supportive role in French satiric movie La Morale de l'histoire that included the unreleased song "Je sortirais sans toi". During summer in Rome, on RAI set she was introduced to a new avant-garde singer-songwriter Luigi Tenco as they also retrospectively sang "La danza di zorba" in duet. Later in September, her Italian managers suggested that she participate with Tenco at the next Sanremo Music Festival. Although in previous years she declined the festival, she accepted this time as she was in a secret relationship with Tenco.

Sanremo and Olympia 67; "The new Dalida is born!" 

With "Mama" in January 1967, Dalida had success in France and Turkey, and was back on top of Italian charts later the same year. "Ciao amore, ciao", written and composed by Tenco, was released alongside as they chose it for their competing song at Sanremo Music Festival. The festival premiered on 26 January and they both separately sang their own version. Under the influence of stage fright and alcohol, Tenco delivered a very bad interpretation while Dalida concluded the evening with ovation, but eventually they were eliminated in the first round. The following night ended tragically when Tenco was found dead by Dalida in their hotel room. It was reported that the suicide letter explained how he died by suicide due to elimination, as protest to hoax and bribed jury, but the major suspicion emerged how actually the mafia was involved. Although the public did not know anything about their relationship, the event greatly affected Dalida and the next concert in Boulogne-Billancourt scheduled for 31 January was cancelled. The following week on 7 February, she appeared on TV show Palmares des chansons dedicating her rendition of "Parlez moi de lui" to Tenco. Wearing the same dress she wore when she found his body, the performance was highly sentimental but she showed nothing of a verging depression. On 26 February, Dalida attempted to take her life, ended up in a hospital and spent five days in a coma. The truth broke out about her engagements with Tenco, leaving her worldwide public stunned. Her career was put on hiatus for three months.

Returning to television on 8 June, on the verge of tears she made her first TV appearance after four months interpreting "Les grilles de ma maison", a cover of Tom Jones' "Green, Green Grass of Home". With lyrics "I was afraid that everything would be foreign to me, but nothing seems changed, it's good to open the grilles of my house" the song was directly dedicated to her return to life, pointing at her Montmartre house. At the same time, Italian album Piccolo ragazzo became a chart success and "Ciao amore, ciao" topped several international charts earning Dalida another gold disc. She also organized a four-month-long comeback tour from June to September, again daily performing in stage city of the Tour de France. The late summer period brought re-release of 1959 "Hava naguila", and a new recording "Je reviens the chercher", the French version of "Son tornata da te" by Tenco. In September, Dalida issued her first compilation album De Bambino à Il silenzio, collecting her gross hits from 1956 to 1965, which was also one of the earliest greatest hits albums ever.

On the night of 5 October, Dalida premiered her third Olympia concert residency which ran for a month. Presenting new songs like "J'ai décidé de vivre", "Entrez sans frapper" and "Loin dans le temps", Dalida made a turnaround in her career orientating her repertoire towards more profound lyrics. Dressed in a long white dress, that she would wear non-stop on tours in future years, Dalida once again achieved huge triumph at the venue. She was nicknamed Saint Dalida by the press. In France-Soir,  wrote: "Dalida killed Mademoiselle Bambino. The new Dalida is born!".

Le temps des fleurs 

After competing for four months at Canzonissima, then the most popular TV show in Italy, in January 1968 Dalida won with "Dan dan dan" that reached number two in Italy. Dalida also came back to film for her first main role in five years, in Italian romantic drama Io ti amo, acting as stewardess Judy alongside Alberto Lupo. The movie was a minor success, but as it was filmed in colour and several of her new songs appeared in, it provided critically acclaimed music video for her latest Italian chart topper and gold certified "L'ultimo valzer". After the filming, Dalida embarked upon a two-year-long world tour that extended until early 1970. With more than 300 live performances it was Dalida's longest tour up to that moment and, as a part of it, in summer 1968 she participated in a popular Italian summer festival Cantagiro and won the main prize. In 1969, during the third leg that started on 9 January in Milan, for the first time in career Dalida performed in Yugoslavia and in lower parts of Africa. After Gabon in December and in Tahiti in January 1970, the tour ended in Iran in February.

"Si j'avais des millions" and "La bambola" were minor hits of early 1968, but in September Dalida came back to huge success in France with song "Le temps des fleurs". It was an instant number one hit with a fair chart performance in several other countries, eventually being recorded in two more languages. The EP was reissued for five more times, a personal record for Barclay, receiving gold certificate and an album of the same name was released. With an issue in single format, "Le temps des fleurs" also announced the end of a long EP era.

On 5 December 1968, in Paris city hall Hôtel de Ville, Dalida received the Medal of the president of the Republic from hands of General de Gaulle who summarised the "success, kindness and modesty of this woman" saying: "By giving you this medal, I wanted to honor a quality, a great lady of France." In France, she remains the only person from show-business to receive such distinction. During same event, Dalida became a Parisian citizen of honor, receiving the Medal of the city of Paris by the Council of Paris, and was also named the Godmother of Montmartre pulbots, the old name for poor children of the quartier where she lived.

Spending 1969 on tour and private travellings to India, Dalida released several less successful recordings like "", "L'an 2005" and "Les violons de mon pays", all poorly promoted on TV and radio attracting some success in Turkey and France. "Oh lady Mary" was released in autumn and remained her last Italian hit. Returning to German TV, Dalida danced casatchok on her new song "Petruschka", which was followed with release of three new albums; Canta in Italiano, In Deutsch and Ma mère me disait, a sales topper in Poland. Dalida was also awarded with MIDEM, award for the best selling artist of the year in Italy, and her first Radio Luxembourg singer of the year award, which she went on to win for several more times.

Les années Orlando – The Orlando years 

Dalida and her brother Orlando were already planning for some time to form their own record house as a vehicle to release and to control her musical output. Dalida's last record released under Barclay label was Concerto pour une voix, an EP released on 15 April 1970. On 1 July Dalida signed a contract International Shows, recently established by Orlando, making him one of only several independent producers of French show business. Their first record Darla dirladada was also the first success of a very long series. Already played on radios for a month, the Greek folklore song was released as single on 15 July. "Darla driladada" was an overnight hit, selling 75,000 copies within the first week and setting a record for largest weekly sales in France. The song became Dalida's another tube de l'été, staying three weeks atop of French sales charts during summer and gaining gold certification in a month. Soon after, Dalida released her second record under her new label; "Ils ont changé ma chanson", a cover of "What Have They Done to My Song Ma", reflecting a drastic change of her repertoire in past years. It was a moderate sales success, but it won her second Radio Luxembourg award. That was followed with "Pour qui pour quoi", her last record in EP format, and "Ils ont changé ma chanson", the first album issued under International Show.

In October 1971, Dalida intended to book herself at Olympia for her big Parisian comeback after four years. Bruno Coquatrix did not believe in her change of style and refused to produce the show so Dalida rented and paid the venue by herself. On 24 November, announced by posters thirty meters long and four meters high on the Champs-Élysées, Dalida premiered a sold-out three-week-long concert residency, with Mike Brant as opening act. Dalida again triumphed, with public and critics plebiscite new repertoire nicknaming her "the queen of the theater" and "a modern Phaedra". Seeing the success, Coquatrix offered "Dali" to return whenever she wants "without having to pay a single cent". Premiere night was both recorded on video and as live album Olympia 71, published a year later alongside Il faut du temps, while the video was first issued in 2012.

Through 1971 and 1972 Dalida held a series of successful worldwide concerts in Asia, Canada, Europe, Lebanon and Latin America. She continued to choose her new songs only for their poetic value, but still paid less attention to their commercial promotion, again traveling to Asia to develop a better understanding of herself. Each time Dalida would appear on TV performing "Comment faire pour oublier", "Si c'était à refaire" or "Avec le temps", as Jacques Pessis said: "masses of crazed fans were chanting "Dali" for the first time, their new nickname for her. She shaped her early 1970s image without even trying... just expressing natural emotions she carried in that period". Inspired by Jesus Christ Superstar, Dalida also experimented with religious themes in songs "Jésus bambino" and "Jésus Kitsch". She came back to high sales in September 1972 with "Parle plus bas", a cover of Godfathers title song. Peaking at number two and with over one-half million copies sold, it became a gross hit in France by the end of year and received gold certificate.

"Paroles, paroles" and "Je suis malade" 

In the late 1972, Dalida recorded duet "Paroles, paroles" with her longtime friend Alain Delon whom she picked on her own. Lyrics tell a story of a man offering a woman "caramels, bonbons et chocolat" and repeats "que tu es belle" (how beautiful are you), to what she answers with "paroles, paroles" (words, words) indicating that his words are nothing but hollow. The single released on 17 January with B side "Pour ne pas vivre seul", topped charts in France, Japan, Mexico and Portugal, and had a fair performance in several other countries. Receiving a triple gold certification, it also spawned a dozen of international covers, inspiring foreign singers to record it in their native languages. Dalida and Delon never performed the song live, but Dalida performed for TV and concerts using his voice in playback. In the future decades, "Paroles paroles" went on to become one of the most notable songs in France, and a signature track of Dalida. Like that, the expression "paroles, paroles" entered everyday language and, as Pessis mentioned: "is often used to evoke those who make promises and never hold them".

In late July, Dalida released another song that went to become her signature track: "Je suis malade". The writer of the song Serge Lama recorded and released it earlier that year, but it did not receive any attention until it was spotted by Dalida who later mentioned: "when I saw it on television for the first time, I cried and I knew I have to record it". Dalida's intention to popularise Lama rather than getting a profit from song made her issue it as a B-side to single "Vado via". After the release and two performances, her version became a hit, but Lama's original also drew public attention. Dalida's gestures and facial expressions while performing "Je suis malade" were a natural expression of her personal connection to lyrics that deal with abandonment and despair. The renditions of the song during the future years left a huge impact on French society and shaped an image of Dalida, described by Vanity Fair as "ultimate drama queen". Both Lama and composer of the song Alice Dona frequently credited solely Dalida for being the one who made the song a success, and for boosting Lama's career. Eventually, covered by several singers mostly as tribute to Dalida, "Je suis malade" also became a song frequently sung at competitions.

1973–1975: Zenith – "Gigi" and "18 ans" 

By the end of 1973, Dalida released the promotional single A-side "Il venait d'avoir 18 ans" with B-side "Non ce n'est pas pour moi". In that same time, she released the album Julien that gathers most of her 1973 songs. The song "Il venait d'avoir 18 ans" quickly started gaining success and it was again released in the beginning of 1974 but as B-side to single A-side Gigi l'amoroso. "Il venait d'avoir 18 ans" peaked number 3 in Québec, number 4 in Belgium, number 13 in Germany, and number 37 in Italy while Gigi l'amoroso beat the record held by Frank Sinatra's Strangers in the Night from 1966 for the most sold single in Benelux and charted number 4 in France and number 1 in Switzerland, number 2 in Netherlands, number 1 in Flanders, number 3 in Québec, number 2 in Spain and number 59 in Italy. The first performance of both songs was during her concerts in Olympia 1974. The whole four weeks were sold out and a triumph for the singer and was followed again with a live album Olympia 75.

1975–1980: Disco period 

In February 1975, French music critics awarded the singer with the Prix de l'Académie du Disque Français. Touring from 1974 to 1975 would follow this period of unprecedented sales. During 1975, she released duet "Et de l'amour de l'amour" with her partner Richard. This single peaked number 16 in France.

At the end of 1975, Dalida released a new album that gathered some songs from singles released in 1974 and 1975 plus some new material. Most of the songs were from the same genre except for the disco-genre song "J'attendrai". This song, released as a single in January 1976, reached number 1 on the French charts and was both first disco hit in France and disco hit in French language. Achieving that, Dalida holds the title of the inventor of French disco. Around the same time, the popularity of the variety show was increasing in France and Dalida started making television appearances on a weekly basis there and across Europe.

Following her disco success, in mid-1976 she released a new album with completely new songs, most of them disco. The most notable one was " Besame mucho" (number 7 in France and number 10 in Turkey). 1977 was a successful year for Dalida both in her private and professional life. She released three albums. One of them was live Olympia 77, released following her again four-week triumph at Olympia in 1977. The other two were albums with completely new songs. "Salma Ya Salama" became the first ever Egyptian folk hit in the world. Originally sung in Egyptian Arabic, the song was translated into French, Italian, and German. Part of the lyrics are based on an old Egyptian folk song about homesickness and celebrating the Egyptian nation.

Dalida continued touring the world, including the USA, for the second time since the 1950s, by playing two nights in New York's Carnegie Hall in November 1978. The New York Times review of the Carnegie Hall concert praised Dalida's performance and noted its intimacy and intensity after she began to converse midway through it, revealing her personality. Most of the audience were French citizens. The concerts were almost sold out, but nevertheless, it was another triumph for her. Due to the concert, she was offered for the second time a contract to perform in the USA, but she refused it again. In February, during her 1977 Canada tour, an obsessed fan tried to kidnap her by using a hammer but did not succeed.

Other hit performances of Dalida include "The Lambeth Walk", sung in English and French. The song "Je suis malade", written and originally performed by Serge Lama was made into a success by Dalida during 1977 although she released it in 1973. In 1979, Dalida recorded her biggest disco hit, "Monday, Tuesday... Laissez-moi danser". The song was a smash hit, peaking at number 1 on the French charts. By the end of 1979, she released the semi-biographical song "Comme disait Mistinguett" where she, through music, speaks about herself in a fun way. Her debut of 1980 was marked by the release of a big disco hit, "Rio do Brasil". Then she released the album Gigi in Paradisco, named for the title song, which was a sequel to her previous hit "Gigi l'amoroso".

In 1979, Dalida met Lester Wilson. Agreeing to work together he became her choreographer for the upcoming spectacle in the Palais des Sports, booked for January 1980. In total, Dalida performed for three hours per day for fifteen days with ten costume changes and twelve dancers in front of an audience of around 90,000 people. Palais des Sports of Paris was the largest playing venue in Paris and one of the biggest in France, there was much the same triumph as in Olympia.

Following the spectacle, Dalida released the double live album Le spectacle du Palais des Sports 1980 and organized a new European tour and a small World tour. She toured in the whole Western and Eastern Europe except Yugoslavia and the USSR. Also, she held concerts in Brazil, USA and Canada. When she came back, she organized a tour across the whole of France delivering more than 20 sold-out concerts monthly across the French towns and cities. In 1980, problems in her private life appeared again and were reflected in the song "À ma manière".

1981–1987: Diva trademark years 

Dalida left disco and started singing slower, moody, deep-minded songs with typical 1980s instruments. In 1981 she broke up with St. Germain.

From March to April 1981, she gave a month of sold-out concerts at the Olympia in Paris, emulating her successful 1980 tour. Her last concert of April 1981 at the Olympia became her last concert at that venue, because the following year, the Olympia went bankrupt (it re-opened in 1989). On the night of her inaugural performance, she became the first singer to be awarded a diamond disc, in recognition of her record sales which had reached 45 million. Olympia was followed up by the release of her last named Olympia album, Olympia 81, but this time, it was not recorded live. She refused to be a model for Marianne of France. Instead of disco, Dalida started to record dance songs, which had soon replaced disco in French clubs. At the end of 1981, she starred in a New Year TV spectacle called Special Dalida. She co-hosted and sang her songs.

At the beginning of 1982, she had many TV appearances singing still unreleased songs, followed by the release of a new dance album, Special Dalida. The most remembered songs of the album are the dance songs "Jouez bouzouki", "Danza" and the moody "Nostalgie". Dalida launched a new world tour in 1982 and spent most of 1982 to 1984 playing sold-out concerts from Rio de Janeiro across Europe to Asia. She made a lot of TV appearances in the 1980s almost every second week. In the summer of 1982, during the FIFA World Cup, like many other singers, Dalida released a song for the French team, "La chanson du Mundial" (#17 in France).

In the first part of 1983, she released several songs, the most notable being "Mourir sur scène". The dance-pop song has very profound lyrics and has remained a big hit, one of the signature tracks by Dalida. Most of her songs of 1983 were gathered on her album released in mid-1983, Les p'tits mots, which also featured such singles as "Lucas" and "Bravo".

By the beginning of 1984, her personal difficulties escalated again; she could not dedicate as much time to her career as she would have wanted. However, she recorded a new collection of mainly dance songs including "Soleil" and "Kalimba de Luna". In mid-1984, she recorded the album Dali, a collection of all her songs released that year. To promote the album, a television special was later released on VHS named Dalida Idéale; it was filmed in 1984, and directed by the then highly rated Jean-Christophe Averty. It includes Dalida singing in seven languages and dancing her way through a huge number of her earlier hits with the best video effects available at the time and wearing more than 40 outfits from the best French and international fashion designers, maintaining her "Glamour" and "DIVA" trademarks gained during the disco era in the late seventies.

She successfully engaged to keep the new radio station NRJ on air through her connections.

Dalida's eye problems returned. She underwent two major eye operations in 1985 and put her career on hold as the stage lights started to become difficult for her to endure. She released "Reviens-moi", a cover of George Michael's "Last Christmas". During early 1985, she occasionally did live performances, as well as many TV appearances. When her eyes recovered in mid-1985, she accepted the role of a young grandmother in the Youssef Chahine film The Sixth Day. The latter will become a commercial failure in France despite very favorable media criticism, especially from intellectuals. Only more than 50,000 entries will be made. As she always wanted to become an actress, she temporarily disregarded her singing career and fully devoted herself to the movie. She returned to France to promote the movie in late 1985.

In 1986, she released Le Visage de l'amour with more new recordings and some singles from the album, which became her last album. "Le temps d'aimer" and "Le Vénitien de Levallois" were songs that failed to hit the charts upon their release. She did promote the album but not as well as she used to do previously, due to issues in her private life which had never been worse since 1967. Dalida, therefore, spent more and more time in her house alone or going out with friends in an attempt to amuse herself, again neglecting her career. Dalida ceased to create new material in the recording studio, instead devoting herself to perform concerts. Once again organising a lot of concerts on a monthly basis and singing her previously-known hits, Dalida was then known for the amazing "show" performances, wearing her wardrobe from 1980 to 1982. She sang glamorous disco-dance songs from same period such as "Je suis toutes les femmes", "Gigi in paradisco", "Il faut danser reggae", "Monday, Tuesday...", "Comme disait la Mistinguett".

By the beginning of 1987, Dalida was entering into severe depression while trying to overcome it. Although no new songs had been recorded, she toured internationally from Los Angeles to the Middle East. Being part of the music spotlight in 1978, many of her songs appeared daily on TV, as well as many notable TV appearances on talk shows from 1986 to 1987. Her last live TV appearance was hosting the Nuit des César on 7 March 1987. Her last live performance took place in Antalya, Turkey from 27 to 29 April 1987, just before her suicide. Her performance was not recorded by the national television of Turkey which was the only TV channel in the country.

Personal life 

Dalida's private life was marred by a series of failed relationships and personal problems. In January 1967, she took part in the Sanremo Festival with her new lover, Italian singer, songwriter, and actor Luigi Tenco. The song he presented was "Ciao amore, ciao" ("Bye Love, Bye"), which he sang together with Dalida but Tenco failed despite Dalida's performance. Tenco died by suicide on 27 January 1967, after learning that his song had been eliminated from the final competition. Tenco was found by Dalida in his hotel room with a bullet wound in his left temple and a note announcing that his gesture was against the jury and public's choices during the competition. Prior to Tenco's suicide, Dalida and he had become engaged. One month later, Dalida attempted to take her life by drug overdose at the  hotel in Paris. She spent five days in a coma and several months convalescing. Dalida returned to the stage the following October.

In December 1967, she became pregnant by a 22-year-old Italian student, Lucio. She had an abortion that left her infertile.

In September 1970, her former husband (1956–1961) Lucien Morisse died by shooting himself in the head.

In April 1975, her close friend, singer Mike Brant leapt to his death from an apartment in Paris. He was 28. Dalida had contributed to his success in France when he opened concerts for her in 1971 at l'Olympia.

In July 1983, her lover from 1972 to 1981, Richard Chanfray, killed himself by inhaling the exhaust gas of his Renault 5 car.

On the night of 2–3 May 1987, Dalida committed suicide by overdosing on barbiturates. She left behind a note which read, "La vie m'est insupportable. Pardonnez-moi." ("Life is unbearable for me. Forgive me.")

Dalida is buried at the Montmartre Cemetery, 18th Division, Chemin des Gardes.

Legacy 
In 1988, a Encyclopædia Universalis poll, published in the French newspaper Le Monde placed Dalida as second in personalities who had the greatest impact on French society, behind Général de Gaulle.

She is also a gay icon in France and the Middle East.

In 2003, for the award "Greatest Singer of the Century" in France (based on three criteria: numbers of album and single sales, number of radio airplays and chart positions), Dalida was placed third after Madonna and Céline Dion, which means that she remained the number one favorite artist in France.

Her output has also been the subject of various remix albums. Since her death, many of Dalida's hits have been remixed to modern techno and dance beats. Around 50 biographies have been written in her name. In 2009, Lara Fabian said that Dalida had influenced her the most. Place Dalida, a square on Montmarte, Paris bears her name, and a street "rue Dalida" in Laval, Quebec, Canada.

 1965 – IFOP Poll: "Favourite French singer'"
1976 – Dalida was voted "Woman of the Year" in Canada, ahead of Jackie Kennedy)
 1982 – Paris Match magazine survey revealed that Dalida was the only representative from show business to appear in a list of most influential French women.
 1985 – Dalida was voted "Favourite French singer" (Télé 7 Jours magazine).
 1986 – VSD magazine published a survey in which Dalida was voted "Favourite French singer".
 1988 – SOFRES/Encyclopædia Universalis: In a survey asking the French public which events had the greatest impact on the French public between 1968 and 1988, 16% of the French public voted the "Death of Général de Gaulle" and 10% voted the "Death of Dalida".
 1989 – Encyclopædia Universalis: By examining the proof of the criteria to find out which person had the biggest impact on French society, it was concluded that Dalida is the second, just after president de Gaulle.
 2001 – IFOP Survey: Dalida was voted the "Most important female singer who had the greatest impact on French society in the 20th century", along with Édith Piaf.
 2005 – Dalida was voted the "Favourite singer in 2004" amongst Italians, and held seventh place amongst the most collected musical artists in Italy.
 2005 – Dalida was voted "Top 58th French person of all time" in a survey sponsored by the France 2 television channel. The only women from the show business which appeared in this list were Catherine Deneuve, Brigitte Bardot, Simone Signoret, Édith Piaf and Dalida.

Tributes
 In 1987, Dalida was honoured with a commemorative coin minted by The French Mint, Monnaie de Paris, issued in gold, bronze and silver, bearing her effigy.
 In 1997, on the 10th anniversary of her death, the Place Dalida, with a statue of her, was established in Paris.
 In 1998, a tribute was held on 27 October in Cairo and the "Dalida Prize" was established and awarded in her honour.
 In 2001, the French government honoured her with a second stamp bearing her likeness which was released by La Poste, the French postal service, as part of the Artistes de chanson (Artists of the song) series. During the eleven months the stamp was available, 10,157,601 copies were sold.
 In 2002, the first TV spectacle for marking the 15th anniversary of her death Dalida, 15 ans déjà (Dalida, 15 years already).
 In 2005, the first biopic of Dalida; two-part telefilm Dalida. Its first broadcast on France 2 reached 13 million viewers, scoring its best audience number since its inception, beating TF1 the same evening during the broadcast of a football match, still holding the record. 
 In 2007, the first of two big expos dedicated to Dalida, "Dalida Expo" was held in Paris City Hall Hôtel de Ville to commemorate the 20th anniversary of her death with an exhibit of her outfits, personal belongings, makeup, documents and previously unreleased photographs. During its four months, the exposition was visited by 300,000 people.
 In 2012, the TV spectacle Dalida, 25 ans déjà (Dalida, 25 years already) marked the 25th anniversary of her death.
 In 2016, the second biopic Dalida had its premiere in the Olympia, the first time in history that the hall was used for a movie. The event was attended by French celebrities from public and political life while the beginning was transmitted live by TF1.
 In 2017, the second exposition dedicated to her, Dalida Expo, was held in Palais Galliera to commemorate the 30th anniversary of her death. During its three months, the exposition was visited by 100,000 people, a record for the gallery due to its limited capacity
 In 2019, she was featured as a Google Doodle on what would have been her 86th birthday.

Depictions

Several theatrical productions have been made about Dalida's life.

In 1999, the play Solitudini – Luigi Tenco e Dalida, written and directed by Maurizio Valtieri, was performed in Rome.
Dalida: Une Vie, directed by René Simard and under the authorization of Orlando Productions, was performed from October 2003 to June 2006, in Quebec, Canada, and was shown in Beirut, Lebanon in May 2004.
In 2005 a two-part television film, Dalida, in which Dalida was portrayed by Sabrina Ferilli, was first broadcast on France 2, reaching 13 million viewers. It was France 2's highest viewership since its inception, beating TF1 the same evening during the broadcast of a football match. The film still holds the record.
In 2005, the play Dalida, à quoi bon vivre au mois de mai ?, written by Joseph Agostini and Caroline Sourrisseau, was performed at the Ateliers Théâtre in Montmartre. 
In 2017, the film Dalida, directed by Lisa Azuelos and assisted by Orlando Productions, featured Sveva Alviti as Dalida. The film achieved moderate success. Its premiere was at Olympia Music Hall, the first time that the hall hosted a film presentation.

Discography

Filmography

Awards

Honours and decorations

  Commandeur of the Ordre des Arts et des Lettres of the French Republic.
  1962: Calabrian Citizen of Honour.
  1968: Godmother of Montmartre street urchins.
  1980: Graulhet Citizen of Honour.

See also 

 List of Dalida live performances
 List of Dalida music in motion pictures and TV
 Mononymous persons
 Culture of France
 Music of France
 Music of Italy
Music of Egypt
Cinema of Egypt
 List of cultural icons of France

References

External links 

 
 
 
 
 Dalida at MelodyTv
 

 
1933 births
1987 suicides
18th arrondissement of Paris
Miss Egypt winners
Burials at Montmartre Cemetery
Eurodisco musicians
Drug-related suicides in France
Barbiturates-related deaths
English-language singers from France
Female suicides
People of Calabrian descent
French people of Calabrian descent
Egyptian people of Italian descent
Actresses from Cairo
Singers from Cairo
Egyptian female models
20th-century Egyptian women singers
Egyptian film actresses
French dance musicians
French female models
French film actresses
French television actresses
French television personalities
Italian-language singers
German-language singers
1930s births
Naturalized citizens of France
Singers who perform in Egyptian Arabic
Women rock singers
Drug-related deaths in France
Japanese-language singers
20th-century French actresses
Dutch-language singers
Hebrew-language singers
Arabic-language singers
20th-century French women singers
Spanish-language singers of France
People of Montmartre